"Don't Cry" is the first hit single from progressive rock band Asia's second album Alpha. "Don't Cry" reached #10 on the Billboard Hot 100 and #9 in Cash Box magazine.  It was the band's second Top 10 Pop hit, and returned them to #1 on Billboard's Top Album Rock Tracks chart.

Track listing
US 7" single

UK 7" single

UK 12" single

Personnel
John Wetton – bass guitar, vocals
Geoff Downes – keyboards
Steve Howe – guitars
Carl Palmer – drums, tambourine

Charts

References

1983 singles
Asia (band) songs
Songs written by Geoff Downes
Songs written by John Wetton
Song recordings produced by Mike Stone (record producer)
Geffen Records singles
1983 songs